Evanston may refer to locations:

in the United States:
 Evanston, Cincinnati, a neighborhood of Cincinnati, Ohio
 Evanston, Illinois
 Evanston, Indiana
 Evanston, Kentucky
 Evanston, Wyoming
in Canada:
 Evanston, Calgary, a neighbourhood in Calgary, Alberta
 Evanston, Nova Scotia

in Australia:
 Evanston, South Australia